Rémy Couvez is a French composer and viellist, a musician who plays the hurdy-gurdy.

Biography 
He was introduced to the hurdy-gurdy in 1978, and he started playing the instrument in 1981. Until 2000, he created music combining the hurdy-gurdy with electric instruments. Since then, he's come back to acoustic music.

Concerts 
In 1982, he performed his first concert solo.

He's currently doing concerts with:
 Quintet: hurdy gurdy, baroque oboe, harpsichord, sackbut and cello ;
 Duet: hurdy gurdy and pipe organ.

Discography 
 1986: Paysages Intérieurs, self-published
 1993: Propos Insolites, Buda Musique editions
 1997: Itinérances, Buda Musique editions
 2000: Wheeling Dance, Buda Musique editions
 2008: Confluence, Buda Musique editions
 2012: Wood Song, Buda Musique editions
 2014: Vielle et Orgue, Buda Musique editions
 2018: Quintus Novum, Buda Musique editions

External links 
 Official website

References 

French composers
Hurdy-gurdy players
Year of birth missing (living people)
Living people